The Battle of Kos was a brief battle in World War II between British/Italian and German forces for control of the Greek island of Kos, in the then Italian-held Dodecanese Islands of the Aegean Sea. The battle was precipitated by the Allied Armistice with Italy. German forces with strong air support quickly overwhelmed the Italian garrison and the recent British reinforcements, denying the Allies a base to attack the German presence in the Balkans and leading to the expulsion and death of the island's Jewish population.

Background

With the capitulation of Italy in September 1943, German forces in the Balkans and the Mediterranean moved to take over the Italian-held areas. At the same time, the Allies, under the instigation of British Prime Minister Winston Churchill, endeavoured to occupy the Dodecanese island chain. The Dodecanese islands, under Italian control since 1912, were strategically located in the southeastern Aegean Sea, and Churchill hoped to use them as a base against German positions in the Balkans, and as a means to pressure neutral Turkey into the war on the Allied side.

British landings
The main prize, the island of Rhodes, fell to a swift attack by a German mechanized brigade. Nevertheless, British forces landed on several islands, most notably Kos and Leros, and together with the Italian forces located there, there were hopes of eventually regaining Rhodes. On 13 September 1943 thirty-eight Liberators from North Africa bombed the three airfields on Rhodes, effectively grounding the German Air Force (Luftwaffe) aircraft, while Special Boat Section (SBS) units landed on Kos, occupying the port and the airfield near the village of Antimachia. On 14 September two Beaufighters and a number of Spitfires from 7 Squadron, SAAF flew on to the airfield. On the night of the 14/15 September, 120 paratroopers from 11th Parachute Battalion were dropped by Dakotas of No. 216 Squadron RAF on the island. The paratroopers were welcomed by the Italian garrison, who laid straw on the landing zone.

At first light on 15 September, a standing patrol of two Spitfires of No. 7 SAAF Squadron was maintained over Kos to give cover to the transport aircraft and ships bringing stores and reinforcements. Among these were the first troops of the RAF Regiment who flew from the British Mandate of Palestine with nine Hispano-Suiza HS.404 guns for anti-aircraft defence, followed two days later by a second detachment, which brought up to strength one of the first of the Regiment's Squadrons to be transported to the battlefield by air with all its weapons.

On the ground, the Allied force consisted of the 1st Battalion, Durham Light Infantry, a company from 11th Parachute battalion of 1st Airborne Division, a company of men from the SBS, and Royal Air Force (RAF) personnel under the command of Lt. Col. L.R.F. Kenyon. The force totalled ca. 1,600 British (although only 1,115 were combatants, 880 army and 235 from the RAF Regiment) and about 3,500 Italian servicemen from the original garrison.

Battle

German aerial bombardment

The German counter-attack began on 17 September with heavy air-bombardment.  The Messerschmitt 109s and Junkers 88s involved met at first with varying success, because of the RAF gunners on the ground and the South African Spitfires in the air. However, "Butterfly Bombs" made Antimachia temporarily unserviceable and damaged the Douglas C-47 Skytrains, but the first detachments of the Durham Light Infantry were landed. One Dakota came down in the sea and its occupants were rescued but interned in Turkey.

German bombing and cannon fire attacks continued to harass the garrison over the next few days. The Luftwaffe flew 100 aircraft into the Aegean area bringing their strength up to 360 aircraft.  While the German air cover improved, the Allies could only rely on a limited number of aircraft due to decisions made by General Eisenhower concerning the British involvement in the Balkan theatre:

The limited aircraft cover for the operation on Kos was completely inadequate and would have a serious effect on the British ability to defend the island. Over the weeks from 13 September to 3 October the Allied aircraft defending Kos suffered many losses from bombardment of the airfield and in air combat. By 26 September the No. 7 Squadron SAAF was reduced to four serviceable aircraft. No. 74 Squadron RAF was flown on to Kos on this day.

The defenders' position on Kos, never enviable, soon became serious and, presently, desperate, for the Italian anti-aircraft defence was negligible and their own resources meagre. To add to their troubles, the area round the airfield they had to protect was too rocky to permit digging in, and there was no time to build blast walls before the enemy was upon them. The air attacks were so severe that casualties inflicted on the British paratroopers forced them to be withdrawn on 25 September.

German landings - Operation "Polar Bear"

On 1 October 1943, a concentration of shipping was observed in the ports of Crete, and early on the following morning a convoy steaming in a north-north-easterly direction south-east of Melos was sighted by British aircraft. Urgent supplies were landed on Kos by five Dakotas, and during their unloading the news came that a small German invasion fleet of 10 vessels was at sea. This flotilla carried a task force composed of a battle group ("Kampfgruppe") from the 22nd Infantry Division in Crete, as well as "Brandenburg" special forces from the mainland, namely the 1st Amphibious Battalion and the 5th Paratrooper Battalion, part of the entire Regiment of Brandenburgers assigned to the attack, all under the command of Lt Gen Friedrich-Wilhelm Müller.

At 04.30 hours on 3 October the invasion of Kos began. By mid-day, 1,200 Germans, well-armed with light artillery and armoured cars, were ashore and in action. Dive-bombing by Junker 87s added to the difficulties of the defence, and in the afternoon Antimachia was overrun. The main German convoy, which had been attacked from air was estimated to have consisted of seven transports, seven landing craft, three destroyers and numerous caiques (fishing craft) and other small craft. The principal landings took place at Marmari and Tingachi (in the north central part of the island) and at Camare Bay (south-west) with subsidiary landings at Forbici and Capo Foco (on the north-east and south-east tips of the island).

Paratroops were dropped west and south of Antimachia. By 12.00 hours the Germans were reported as having landed 1,500 men. At about 13.30 hours a further small German paratroop landing of a company from the Brandenburg Division was made in the centre of the island, and more troops arrived by sea. For the British forces the situation was reported as confused, but by 18.00 it was further reported as critical. The Durham Light Infantry, SBS and paratroopers fought gallantly but in the face of superior numbers and heavier equipment were forced to withdraw to positions covering the town and port of Kos and the airfield. That evening the Germans attacked the British positions in strength reducing the British position to a small area around the town of Kos. The German strength had been reinforced to an estimated 4,000 men by the evening of 3 October.

The Italian and British forces had ceased organised resistance by 06.00 on 4 October. 1,388 British and 3,145 Italians were taken prisoners, while the captured Italian commander of the island, Col. Felice Leggio, and nearly 100 of his officers were shot in a major warcrime by the Germans. A German communiqué of 5 October reporting the cessation of hostilities on Kos gave the number of prisoners taken as 600 British and 2,500 Italians, with more Italians coming in. A number of the British force escaped to neighbouring islands and were rescued by the Special Boat Service operating at night.

Aftermath
The capture of Kos would have disastrous consequences for British operations in the Dodecanese Islands. Deprived of air cover, the Allies were in the long run unable to hold the other islands, while the Germans pressed their advantage, capturing Leros a month later and completing their conquest of the Dodecanese by the end of November. In the conclusion of the official despatch covering these operations, it is remarked that:

A further consequence of the German occupation of Kos was the deportation of the small long established Jewish congregation to the European death camps. None of the Jews survived the war.

References

Sources
 
 
 
 
 
 Ανδρουλάκης, Γεώργιος, Ημέρες πολέμου στην Κω, Το χρονικό της στρατιωτικής καταιγίδας - 1943, Ιωλκός, Αθήνα 2013,

External links

 The South African Military Society

Dodecanese campaign
Battles of World War II involving Italy
Battles of World War II involving the United Kingdom
Battles of World War II involving Germany
Kos
Battles and operations of World War II involving Greece
Conflicts in 1943
1943 in Greece
Kos
Airborne operations of World War II
Amphibious operations of World War II
October 1943 events